The 1979 Omloop Het Volk was the 34th edition of the Omloop Het Volk cycle race and was held on 3 March 1979. The race started and finished in Ghent. The race was won by Roger De Vlaeminck.

General classification

References

1979
Omloop Het Nieuwsblad
Omloop Het Nieuwsblad